Abel Baer (March 16, 1893 – October 5, 1976) was an American songwriter, associated with Tin Pan Alley.

Biography
Born in Baltimore, Maryland, Baer graduated from the College of Physicians and Surgeons, specialising in dentistry. Baer left medicine after serving in World War I and began work as a songwriter for a music publisher.

Among Baer's collaborators were L. Wolfe Gilbert, Stanley Adams, Cliff Friend, Sam M. Lewis and Mabel Wayne.

Baer moved to Hollywood in 1929, contributing songs to Paramount on Parade, True to the Navy and Frozen Justice. On Broadway, Baer worked on the scores for the musicals Lady Do and Old Bill M.P.

Songs written by Baer
"Am I to Blame?"
"Blue Hoosier Blues" 
"Chapel of the Roses"
"Don't Wait 'Til the Night Before Christmas"
"Don't Wake Me Up, Let Me Dream" 
"Garden in Granada" 
"Gee But You're Swell" 
"Harriet" 
"I Miss My Swiss" 
"I'm Sitting Pretty in a Pretty Little City" 
"It’s the Girl" 
"June Night” 
"Lucky Lindy!" 
"Mama Loves Papa: Papa Loves Mama" 
"My Mother's Eyes" 
"The Night When Love Was Born" 
"There Are Such Things" 
"When the One You Love, Loves You"

References

External links
 Abel Baer recordings at the Discography of American Historical Recordings.

1893 births
1976 deaths
American dentists
American military personnel of World War I
Writers from Baltimore
American male songwriters
20th-century American musicians
20th-century American male musicians
20th-century dentists